Missio (often stylized MISSIO) is an American electronic alternative duo formed in 2014 in Austin, Texas. It currently consists of founding member Matthew Brue (front-man/songwriter/producer), and David Butler (songwriter/producer).

History

Formation 
Missio was formed in 2015 by songwriter/vocalist Matthew Brue. After the completion of his demos, Brue hired friend and local producer/engineer David Butler to collaborate on their self-titled EP, which would later be released in November 2016. After unexpected online success, Brue made his debut appearance under the name MISSIO at the SXSW festival in 2016 with help from Butler. Brue invited Butler to officially join the act in July 2016.

Brue was active as a solo artist  under the name Missio before Butler joined. He was featured on Said the Sky's songs "Nostalgia" and "Darling" in mid-late 2015.

During an interview, Brue explained that the name MISSIO comes from the Latin word for "mission". This phrase is significant to him because it is reminiscent of the time period in his life when he was recovering from an addiction, and as a result, had the word tattooed on his arm.

Loner (2017)
In 2017, they signed a record deal with RCA Records and released the single "Middle Fingers", which peaked at No. 9 on the Alternative Songs chart. Missio's debut album, Loner, was released May 19, 2017.

On September 28, 2018 Missio posted on their Facebook page that their as yet untitled second album was complete. Six month later, on March 15, they announced the name of the new album would be The Darker the Weather // The Better the Man, and it'd be released on April 12, 2019.

The Darker the Weather // The Better the Man (2019)
The duo's second album was released on April 12, 2019, and contains 13 tracks.

Can You Feel the Sun (2020)
Missio released the single "Wolves" on June 24, 2020. The song would go on to reach the #1 spot on Sirius XM's AltNation Alt18 Countdown. The single "Hoodie Up" was released on July 29. On September 9, Missio released the singles "Can You Feel the Sun" and "Don't Forget to Open Your Eyes" along with the announcement that their 10 track third album also titled "Can You Feel the Sun" would be released on October 23, 2020.

Members
 Matthew Brue – vocalist/songwriter/producer (2015–present)
 David Butler – songwriter/producer (2016–present)

Discography

Albums
Loner (2017)
The Darker the Weather // The Better the Man (2019)
Can You Feel the Sun (2020)
VILLAIN (2022)

EPs
Skeletons: Part 1 (2017)
Skeletons: Part 2 (2018)
Skeletons: Part 3 (2021)
''I Am Sad (2023)

Singles

Music videos

Tours

Rad Drugz Tour (2019)

References

External links

 

RCA Records artists
Musical groups established in 2016
Musical groups from Austin, Texas
2016 establishments in Texas